Kahnuh-e Modim (also Romanized as Kahnūḥ-e Modīm; also known as Kahnooj, Kahnū, Kahnūj, Kahnūj-e Modīm, and Kahnūj-e Mowdīm) is a village in Zangiabad Rural District, in the Central District of Kerman County, Kerman Province, Iran. At the 2006 census, its population was 853, in 194 families.

References 

Populated places in Kerman County